Jan Garrigue Masaryk (14 September 1886 – 10 March 1948) was a Czech diplomat and politician who served as the Foreign Minister of Czechoslovakia from 1940 to 1948. American journalist John Gunther described Masaryk as "a brave, honest, turbulent, and impulsive man".

Early life 
Born in Prague, he was the son of professor and politician Tomáš Garrigue Masaryk (who became the first president of Czechoslovakia in 1918) and Charlotte Garrigue, Tomáš Garrigue Masaryk's American wife. Masaryk was educated in Prague and also in the United States, where he lived for a time as a drifter and for a time as a steelworker. Because of his youth in the United States, Masaryk always spoke both Czech and English with a strong American accent. He returned home in 1913 and served in the Austro-Hungarian Army during the First World War. Masaryk served in Galicia and learned Polish during his wartime career. The fact that his father was in exile, working for Czech independence from the Austrian empire, made him the subject of bullying and hazing during his military service as the son of a "traitor". His unhappy military service made him unwilling to speak very much of his time as a soldier after the war as it held too many painful memories. 

He then joined the diplomatic service and became chargé d'affaires to the US in 1919 and then as counselor to the legation in London. In 1922, he became secretary to the Czechoslovak foreign minister Edvard Beneš. In 1925, he was made minister-plenipotentiary to Britain. The British scholar Robert Powell described Masaryk as "the most unconventional of diplomats. None was less tied to protocol. Witty, shrewd, with an abundance of common sense, he often triumphed over circumstances, which baffled others more intellectually cleverer, but lacking his psychological insight... He could be disconcertingly direct in his conversation and he considerably embarrassed certain types of English people. His manner was American rather than English, his racy language often shocking to people who had not the wit or patience to look beyond the actual expressions used." By contrast, the  Czech historian Zbyněk Zeman and the German historian Rainer Karlsch described Masaryk as a weak man who drifted during his time in the United States, was psychologically unstable, and needed someone to guide him through life.  His father resigned as president in 1935 and died two years later. He was succeeded by Edvard Beneš. Masaryk had been dominated by his father, and afterward by Beneš, who played the role of a surrogate father.

Minister-plenipotentiary in London
Right from his arrival in London, Masaryk in his reports to Prague warned that many officials in Great Britain's Foreign Office were in the grip of nostalgia for the Austrian empire, haunted by what he called the "ghost of the Habsburg empire". Masaryk expressed concern that many in the Foreign Office were openly hostile towards Czechoslovakia and considered the nation a mistake that should never have been allowed to happen.

On 21 June 1927, under the influence of his Hungarian mistress, Princess Stephanie von Hohenlohe, the British press baron Lord Rothermere published a leader (editorial) in The Daily Mail newspaper calling for Hungary to regain lands lost under the Treaty of Trianon. Rothermere deemed it unjust that Hungary—a nation dominated by what he admiringly called a "chivalrous and warlike aristocracy"—should have its borders truncated and that Magyars should be placed under the rule of  the peoples of Romania, Czechoslovakia, and Yugoslavia, whom Rothermere described as "cruder and more barbaric races". Through primarily concerned about what he called "justice for Hungary", Rothermere also argued that the Sudetenland should go to Germany.  Rothermere's leader caused much worry in Prague and Beneš rushed to London to inquire if Rothermere was acting on behalf of the British government.

To counter the pro-Hungarian articles in The Daily Mail, the hostility of the Foreign Office, and the indifference of the British people to Czechoslovakia, Masaryk had money given to British journalists who wrote pro-Czechoslovak articles to make these articles widely available in a bid to influence British public opinion. The two most important British intellectuals whom Masaryk supported were the journalist Wickham Steed and the historian Robert Seton-Watson, both of whom were staunch supporters of Czechoslovakia and longtime friends of his father, President Masaryk. Masaryk provided the funds to make the writings of Steed and Seton-Watson available to the widest possible audience. The faculty and students at the School of East European and Slavonic Studies at King's College London tended to be very sympathetic towards Czechoslovakia, which was seen as a model democracy, and Masaryk often provided the funds to publicise their work.  In 1930, when Steed's journal The Review of Reviews went bankrupt, Masaryk granted him enough money to keep his journal afloat. As part of his cultural diplomacy, Masaryk sometimes worked with Yugoslav diplomats to provide the money for journalists willing to challenge the pro-Hungarian slant of The Daily Mail, which was just as alarming to Belgrade as it was to Prague.

When Joachim von Ribbentrop arrived in London in October 1936 as the new German ambassador to the Court of St. James, he sent out invitations to the other ambassadors to attend a ball to introduce himself as was the normal practice at the time. Instead of using French (the language of diplomacy) in his invitations, which was the standard protocol, Ribbentrop insisted on using German as way to show the superiority of Germany. Masaryk responded to this gross violation of diplomatic protocol by giving his reply to Ribbentrop's letter in Czech, instead of German as Ribbentrop had expected. The other ambassadors did likewise with the Japanese ambassador responding in Japanese and the Turkish ambassador responding in Turkish, which caused chaos at the German embassy as nobody was certain who attending the ball, as the German embassy lacked people able to translate the various replies. During the Abdication crisis, Masaryk was hostile to the new king Edward VIII, whom he described as a Nazi sympathizer, writing in a dispatch to Prague that king "felt closer to fascism and  Nazism than democracy, which he found slow and boring." Masaryk was equally hostile towards the king's mistress, Mrs. Wallis Simpson, whom he reported has stated she felt at home in Vienna and Budapest while loathing Prague. When Edward abdicated to marry Mrs. Simpson, Masaryk was relieved, writing that Ribbentrop had "lost in Mrs. Simpson a dangerous ally".

Unlike Beneš, Masaryk understood that the pro-Hungarian slant of The Daily Mail was caused by influence on Lord Rothermere of Princess von Hohenlohe, whom Masaryk also knew was the mistress of Fritz Wiedemann, the adjunct to Adolf Hitler. Masaryk described Rothermere as dominated by Hohenlohe, writing that he would do anything to please her. In a dispatch to Prague,  Masaryk wrote: "Is there any decency left in the world? A great scandal will erupt one day when the role upon which Steffi von Hohenlohe, née Richter, played during the visit of Wiedemann is revealed. This world-famous secret agent, spy, and swindler, who is a full Jewess, constitutes today the centre of Hitler's propaganda in London. Wiedemann stayed at her place. She keeps Hitler's photograph on her desk, inscribed "To my dear Princess Hohenlohe-Adolf Hitler", and next to it a photograph of Horthy, dedicated to the 'great stateswoman'." 

Starting in 1935, the Sudeten German leader Konrad Henlein had visited London four times between 1935-1938 to give speeches criticising Czechoslovakia. Masaryk realized belatedly that Czechoslovakia was losing the propaganda war as the British media became enamoured of Henlein. In late December 1936 Masaryk gave an address to a group of British MPs to make the case for Czechoslovakia. Much of the address concerned defending the decision on part of Beneš to sign an alliance with the Soviet Union in 1935, which was unpopular in Britain. Masaryk argued that the alliance was necessary as it brought the Soviet Union around to defending the international order created by the Treaty of Versailles instead of trying to undermine it as had previously been the case. Masaryk concluded: "If we treat Russia as a pariah, it cannot be excluded that Russia and Germany could again get together." After his speech, Masaryk had an informal question and answer session with the assembled MPs. The two MPs that Masaryk spoke to the most were Sir Austen Chamberlain and Winston Churchill. Churchill warned Masaryk that British public opinion was turning against Czechoslovakia because of the Sudetenland issue, which the German government "would be able to use against us".

In May 1937, the Foreign Secretary, Anthony Eden, introduced Masaryk to the newly crowned king, George VI. Eden told the king that "the political and economic situation in Czechoslovakia, Sir, is good and firm." At the same audience, Ribbentrop greeted the king by giving him the Nazi salute, to which the king responded to with a bemused smile. The interaction between Ribbentrop and George left Masaryk uncertain to regard this as either silly or sinister. Masaryk reported to Prague that it would be unwise to place too much trust in Britain, which regarded Czechoslovakia as a problem in Europe. By 1938, Masaryk was reporting: "The English dislike us intensely. We are a deadweight for them and they curse the day on which we were founded."

During the Sudetenland crisis in the summer and fall of 1938, Masaryk traveled between London and Prague to meet with Beneš. To resolve the Sudetenland crisis, British Prime Minister Neville Chamberlain visited Germany to meet Adolf Hitler in his vacation home near Berchtesgaden on 15 September 1938. At the Berchtesgaden summit, it was agreed that the Sudetenland would "go home to the Reich" as Hitler had been demanding ever since the Nazi Party Congress at Nuremberg (Reichsparteitag) on 12 September 1938. In an attempt to sway British public opinion against the policy of the Chamberlain government, Masaryk, together with the Soviet ambassador Ivan Maisky, was in contact with Clement Attlee, the leader of the Labour Party, which was the Official Opposition to the Conservative-dominated National Government. Maisky and Masaryk encouraged Attlee to challenge the government's policy in the House of Commons. Masaryk was also in contact with Charles Corbin, the French ambassador in London.  As a further step, Beneš had a large sum of money transferred to the Czechoslovak legation for Masaryk to spend on winning over British public opinion. Masaryk donated much of the money to Churchill's group "The Focus". Unknown to Masaryk, the Forschungsamt ("Research Office") had broken the Czechoslovak diplomatic codes. Hermann Göring who was a close friend of Sir Nevile Henderson, the British ambassador to Germany, informed him that Masaryk was donating money to Churchill, information which Henderson in turn passed on to Chamberlain. The British historian Victor Rothwell noted that the revelation that Masaryk was subsidising Chamberlain's domestic critics such as Churchill made an extremely bad impression upon Chamberlain, and that much of the hostility that Chamberlain displayed towards Masaryk was due to this revelation. 

Under very strong Anglo-French pressure, President Beneš agreed to the terms of the Berchtesgaden summit on 19 September 1938. However, at the Bad Godesberg summit on 24 September 1938, Hitler rejected the Anglo-French plan for ceding the Sudetenland to Germany, telling Chamberlain that the Sudetenland needed to be annexed to Germany before 1 October 1938 rather than after October 1 as the Anglo-French plan called for. The Bad Godesberg summit pushed Europe to the brink of war. On 25 September 1938, Masaryk arrived at 10 Downing Street to tell Chamberlain that through Beneš had accepted the results of the Berchtesgaden summit, he rejected the German timetable for handing over the Sudetenland put forward at the Bad Godesberg summit. Much to Masaryk's annoyance, both Chamberlain and the Foreign Secretary, Lord Halifax, seemed more angry at Beneš for not withdrawing Czechoslovak troops from the border forts in the Sudetenland rather than at Hitler, leading Masaryk in a dispatch to Beneš recounting the meeting to call both Chamberlain and Halifax "stupid". To resolve the crisis on 28 September 1938, it was announced that an emergency summit would be held in Munich the next day to be attended by Hitler, Chamberlain, Benito Mussolini, and Édouard Daladier. To Masaryk's fury, the Munich conference was a return to the congress diplomacy of the 19th century where the leaders of the great powers would meet to decide the fate of Europe with no involvement from the small powers. Halifax told Masaryk that Vojtěch Mastný, the Czechoslovak minister-plenipotentiary in Berlin, would be allowed to attend the Munich conference only as an "observer" for "information only" with no power to be actually involved in the conference.

The resulting Munich Agreement of 30 September 1938 put an end to the crisis. Though the Munich Agreement was actually a compromise as Hitler dropped the demand to have the Sudetenland before 1 October 1938, it was agreed that the Sudetenland would go to Germany in stages over the course of October 1938. Without the natural defensive barrier posed by the mountains of the Sudetenland, Czechoslovakia was defenseless against Germany, and as such the new Czechoslovak president Emil Hácha promptly performed a volte-face in foreign policy. A sign of the new foreign policy came with the order that the staff of the legation in London should remove all the portraits of President Beneš and President Masaryk from the walls. After the Munich conference, Masaryk met with Chamberlain and Halifax at 10 Downing Street where he stated: "If you have sacrificed my nation for the sake of peace, I will be the first to applaud you. But if not gentlemen, then God help your souls." On 1 October 1938, Churchill telephoned Masaryk to tell him that Beneš should delay handing over the border forts in the Sudetenland for the next 48 hours, as he was convinced that "a great reaction against the betrayal committed on us" would occur within the 48 hours that would topple the Chamberlain government and presumably install Churchill as prime minister. Masaryk did not believe this, and advised Beneš to disregard Churchill's advice, warning that Churchill was reckless and that however he much he hoped that Chamberlain's government might fall because of the Munich Agreement, he did not believe that this was very likely. Unknown to both Churchill and Masaryk, their phones had been tapped by MI5, and the conversation recording Churchill's attempt to sabotage the Munich Agreement was passed on to Chamberlain, who was not impressed.

In October 1938, the Sudetenland was occupied by Germany and Masaryk resigned as ambassador in protest, although he remained in London. Other government members including Beneš also resigned. In his last dispatch to Prague on 5 December 1938, Masaryk reported that the British now regarded Czecho-Slovakia (as the country had been renamed) as a German satellite state. In the letter announcing his resignation as minister on 30 December 1938, Masaryk wrote of the "prophylactic measures towards establishing permanent peace in Europe" where "my country was subjected to surgical appeasement with unprecedented vigor and not the slightest trace of anesthetic." Masaryk then left Britain to visit the United States, where he gave speeches criticizing appeasement. In a speech in January 1939, he argued that the Munich Agreement would have been justified if it brought about "permanent peace" in Europe, but he argued that it was very unlikely to do so.

On 15 March 1939, Germany occupied the remaining parts of the Czech provinces of Bohemia and Moravia, and a puppet Slovak state was established in Slovakia. The next day, 16 March 1939, Masaryk went on a radio station in New York, where in a radio address to the American people given in English, he stated: "Can I hope that this last blow to my homeland should dispel all doubts as to the future policy of the masters of central Europe? The rape of Bohemia in all its vulgarity is more than I can describe. Forgive me-". At that point, Masaryk broke down in tears. Upon regaining his composure, Masaryk stated: "I do not envy those who are perpetuating this horrible drama, either by vandal force or by turning their faces to the wall. They have committed sins against God." In July 1939, Masaryk returned to London, where he rented a flat in Westminster.

Wartime 
During the war he regularly made broadcasts over the BBC to occupied Czechoslovakia starting in September 1939 and ending in April 1945. Masaryk's speeches on the BBC's Czech language station made him into a national hero. It was illegal to listen to the BBC in the Protectorate of Bohemia-Moravia, but that did not stop people from tuning in to the BBC every Wednesday night  to hear him speak on a radio program entitled Volá Londýn (London Calling). On 8 September 1939, Masaryk gave his first radio broadcast on  the Volá Londýn show, where he called for "a free Czechoslovakia in a free Europe". During the war, the Volá Londýn radio show was the most popular radio program in Czechoslovakia and Masaryk was the most popular speaker on the show.

In an article published in Central European Observer on 1 February 1940, Masaryk declared his war aims as: "My conviction is that our little country is not going to be saved by any of these grand 'isms'-neither Fascism nor Bolshevism, Pan-Germanism or Pan-Slavism...I am definitely a Slav, but I hope an European first. I am convinced that the fate of our people cannot be separated from that of other Central European and Danubian peoples, whether they are Slavs or not...Narrow nationalism should disappear...An equal partnership in the cause of an European Risorgimento, a breakaway from isms of every kind. A Free Germany in a Free Europe; and besides her the Czechoslovakia of St. Wenceslas, Hus, Comenius, Palacký, Smetana, Masaryk and Čapek...A Free Czechoslovakia in a Free Europe".

When a Czechoslovak government-in-exile was established in Britain in July 1940, Masaryk was appointed Foreign Minister.  He had a flat at Westminster Gardens, Marsham Street in London but often stayed at the Czechoslovak Chancellery residence at Wingrave or with President Beneš at Aston Abbotts, both near Aylesbury in Buckinghamshire. With the launch of Operation Barbarossa on 22 June 1941, Beneš had an unlimited faith in the potential of the Soviet Union, believing that Germany would be defeated by the spring of 1942 at the latest. Masaryk told the other cabinet members: "he [Beneš] now only as Russia on his mind. We must hold him, so he wouldn't fly off to the sky".  In 1942 Masaryk received an LL.D. from Bates College. Beneš had lived in France for much of his life, and was described as someone who "knew France" well, but in contrast, he found the British to be something of a "mystery". Masaryk who lived in London for so long often made suggestions to appeal to a British audience. Powell wrote: "An understanding of human psychology was not one of the President's outstanding achievements, nor was his knowledge of languages. Masaryk made up for these deficiencies".

Beneš's main interest as president of a government-in-exile to have the British agree to abrogate the Munich Agreement and accept that after the war the Sudetenland was to become part of Czechoslovakia again, a war aim that the British were initially opposed to as the British position until August 1942 was that the Munich Agreement was still in effect. In a letter to Eden, who was again serving as Foreign Secretary, on 25 August 1941, Masaryk expressed much concern that the Atlantic Charter would mean that the Sudetenland would remain a part of Germany. Masaryk argued to Eden that Czechoslovakia and the other neighbors of Germany needed a situation after the war that "would enable them to defend peace for themselves and for the world against any future attempts by aggression by Germany", which in turn required a defensible frontier (i.e. returning the Sudetenland to Czechoslovakia). Masaryk as foreign minister was regarded by the Foreign Office as the more reasonable than Beneš who was viewed as obstinate on the Sudetenland issue.

In a 1943 speech on the Volá Londýn radio show to celebrate the Jewish new year, Masaryk urged people in the Protectorate of Bohemia-Moravia to assist the Jewish community, saying it was incumbent to extent a helping hand to the "most wretched of the wretched" as he called the Jews of the protectorate, saying that he wanted ordinary Czechs to be able say after the war that "we remained decent people". A supporter of Zionism, Masaryk was a friend of Dr. Chaim Weizmann.   

In June 1943, Masaryk spoke with Philip Nichols of the Foreign Office and expressed much doubt about a proposed treaty to create a military alliance between Czechoslovakia and the Soviet Union that was being energetically championed by Zdeněk Fierlinger, the Czechoslovak ambassador in Moscow. Through Masaryk did not oppose the proposed treaty outright, he hinted to Nichols that he preferred that after the war that Czechoslovakia move closer to Poland rather than the Soviet Union. Between 17 October 1943 – 10 February 1944, Masaryk went on a lengthy speaking tour of the United States, which removed him from the meetings of the Czechoslovak cabinet. In December 1943, Beneš went to Moscow to sign a treaty creating a 25-year military alliance between Czechoslovakia and the Soviet Union. Upon his return to London, Masaryk was forced to accept the fait accompli. In a radio speech on 16 February 1944, Masaryk stated that the Soviet-Czechoslovak alliance "was approved of in America", though "there were a few reactionaries who hide their own selfish interests behind the pretense of the fear of Bolshevism". Masaryk added that "that we should get used to calling it the Soviet empire. Because it will be the Soviet empire which will play the most important role on the continent".

In an unauthorised act, Fierlinger in July 1944 sent out a public telegram to Edward Osóbka-Morawski, celebrating the entry of the Polish People's Army onto Polish soil, which led Beneš to rebuke Fierlinger for an act that implied support for the Soviet puppet Lublin government. Masaryk wanted to fire Fierlinger for that letter, complaining he was no longer representing Czechoslovakia in Moscow in any meaningful sense of the term. On 28 July 1944, the entire Czechoslovak cabinet recommended to Beneš that he sack Fierlinger as ambassador in Moscow and appoint a new ambassador who would represent the interests of the government-in-exile instead of the Soviet Union, advice that Beneš refused to accept.

In April 1945, Beneš and Masaryk travelled to Moscow to meet Stalin, where it was agreed that the foreign policy of Czechoslovakia would be aligned with the Soviet Union, but that Czechoslovakia would retain its independence and democracy.

After the war 
Masaryk remained Foreign Minister following the liberation of Czechoslovakia as part of the multi-party, communist-dominated National Front government. The Communists under Klement Gottwald saw their position strengthened after the 1946 elections but Masaryk stayed on as Foreign Minister. He was concerned with retaining the friendship of the Soviet Union, but was dismayed by the veto they put on Czechoslovak participation in the Marshall Plan.

Czechoslovakia sold arms to Israel during the 1948 Arab–Israeli War. The deliveries from Czechoslovakia proved important for the establishment of Israel. Masaryk personally signed the first contract on 14 January 1948. Because Masaryk was viewed as the most sympathetic to the Jews of members of the postwar government, he was given the task of "appeasing Jewish organisations in the west" in terms of the government's plans to expel the country's German population, including German-speaking Jews.

In February 1948 the majority of the non-communist cabinet members resigned, hoping to force new elections, but instead a communist government under Gottwald was formed in what became known as the Czech coup ("Victorious February" in the Eastern Bloc). Masaryk met the visiting Soviet deputy foreign minister, Zorin, who told him that he hoped that he would become a member of the "new government", which confused Masaryk as the current government had not fallen. Zorin told him that "Gottwald is our only guarantee. The government must be cleaned up. We are determined to build a new one, which is more friendly to us and we shall support Gottwald".   Masaryk remained Foreign Minister, and was the only prominent minister in the new government who was neither a Communist nor a fellow traveller. However, he was apparently uncertain about his decision and possibly regretted his decision not to oppose the communist coup by broadcasting to the Czech people on national radio, where he was a much loved celebrity.

Masaryk served as the President of the World Federation of United Nations Associations. A memorial to his memory and his presidency of the Organisation is located in Geneva, Switzerland. Flowers are laid annually by the Permanent Representative of the Czech Republic to the United Nations.

Death 

On 10 March 1948 Masaryk was found dead, dressed only in his pajamas, in the courtyard of the Foreign Ministry (the Černín Palace in Prague) below his bathroom window. 

Jan Masaryk's remains were buried next to his parents in a plot at Lány cemetery, where in 1994 also the ashes of his sister Alice Masaryková were laid to rest.

The Ministry of the Interior claimed that he had committed suicide by jumping out of the window, but at the time, it was  widely assumed that he was murdered at the behest of the nascent Communist government. On the other hand, many of his close associates (e.g. his secretary Antonín Sum, his press assistant Josef Josten, or Viktor Fischl) have always defended the suicide story.

In a second investigation taken in 1968 during the Prague Spring, Masaryk's death was ruled an accident, not excluding a murder and a third investigation in the early 1990s after the Velvet Revolution concluded that it had been a murder.

In his 1981 autobiography History and Memory, US Ambassador Charles W. Yost, a friend of Masaryk who worked with him in Prague in 1947, and also a friend of Masaryk's fiancé Marcia Davenport, wrote, "The Communists used him and, when his usefulness was past, flung him out of a window to his death."

Discussions about the mysterious circumstances of his death continued for some time. Those who believe that Masaryk was murdered called it the Third Defenestration of Prague, and point to the presence of nail marks on the window sill from which Masaryk fell, as well as smearings of feces and Masaryk's stated intention to leave Prague the next day for London. Members of Masaryk's family—including his former wife, Frances Crane Leatherbee, a former in-law named Sylvia E. Crane, and his sister Alice Masaryková — stated their belief that he had indeed killed himself, according to a letter written by Sylvia E. Crane to The New York Times, and considered the possibility of murder a "cold war cliché". However, a Prague police report in 2004 concluded after forensic research that Masaryk had indeed been thrown out of the window to his death. This report was seemingly corroborated in 2006 when a Russian journalist claimed that his mother knew the Russian intelligence officer who threw Masaryk out of the window of the west bathroom of Masaryk's flat.

The highest-ranking Soviet Bloc intelligence defector, Lt. Gen. Ion Mihai Pacepa, claimed he had a conversation with Nicolae Ceauşescu, who told him about "ten international leaders the Kremlin killed or tried to kill". Jan Masaryk was one of them.

Czech historian Václava Jandečková has tentatively suggested in her 2015 monograph "Kauza Jan Masaryk: Nový pohled" (The Jan Masaryk Case: A New Perspective) that Masaryk might have been murdered by Jan Bydžovský and František Fryč, who believed they were working for the British intelligence service SIS, but most probably fell victim to NKVD agents. Bydžovský confessed to murdering Masaryk when interrogated in prison by the Czech secret police StB in the 1950s (in an unrelated case); but later denied it. Jandečková argues that this confession cannot be so easily dismissed as has been believed, especially since Bydžovský certainly was not hallucinating or drugged, and the interrogators seem to have been surprised by his confession (at his trial, the Masaryk murder was not "used" or even mentioned, although a separate re-investigation by the StB continued for more than a year).

A new investigation that opened in 2019 included a new expert opinion regarding the mechanics of the fall, and an old tape by the policeman who was among the first at the crime scene, testifying the body had been already moved when he arrived. The investigation closed in 2021, with murder, accident or suicide all possible.

Private life 

From 1924 until their divorce in 1931, Masaryk was married to Frances Crane Leatherbee (1887-1954). An heiress to the Crane piping, valves and elevator fortune, and the former wife of Robert Leatherbee, she was a daughter of Charles R. Crane, a U.S. minister to China; and a sister of Richard Teller Crane II, a U.S. ambassador to Czechoslovakia. By that marriage, Masaryk had three stepchildren: Charles Leatherbee, Robert Leatherbee Jr., and Richard Crane Leatherbee. Stepson Charles Leatherbee (Harvard 1929) co-founded the University Players, a summer stock company in Falmouth, Massachusetts, in 1928 with Bretaigne Windust. He married Mary Lee Logan (1910-1972), younger sister of Joshua Logan, who became one of the co-directors of the University Players in 1931.

In 1945 the exile Masaryk became close to the American writer Marcia Davenport, whom he felt had a strong affinity to Czechs and to the city of Prague, depicted in several of her books. Davenport had in 1944 divorced her husband Russell Davenport and is known to have followed Masaryk to post-war Prague and lived with him there from 1945 to 1948. Following the Communist coup she returned to London, where she and Masaryk planned to be married as soon as he could join her, but only a few days later he was found dead.

Masaryk was a skilled amateur pianist. In that capacity, he accompanied Jarmila Novotná in a recital of Czech folk songs issued on 78 RPM records to commemorate the victims of the Nazi eradication of Lidice.

He is reputed to have had an exquisite sense of humour. It is reported that when he was a young Czechoslovak Ambassador to the US, he attended many parties and once the hostess invited him to play the violin. Accepting graciously, he played a Czech nursery song to enthusiastic applause from the audience. Leaving the party with a friend, he was asked why had he been asked to play the violin, to which he replied: "Oh, it's all very simple-- don't you see? They have mixed me up with my father; they mixed him up with Paderewski. And they mixed the piano up with the violin."

Jan Masaryk Medal

The Honorary Silver Medal of Jan Masaryk (Czech: Stříbrná medaile Jana Masaryka) is awarded by the Ministry of Foreign Affairs of the Czech Republic and is one of the highest awards that can be received by foreign nationals.

See also
 A Prominent Patient, a 2017 film
List of unsolved deaths

References

Further reading 

 
  Foreword by Madeleine Albright

External links

 

1886 births
1948 deaths
Ambassadors of Czechoslovakia to the United Kingdom
Austro-Hungarian military personnel of World War I
Bates College alumni
Children of national leaders
Czech Freemasons
Czechoslovak diplomats
Czech people of American descent
Czech people of French descent
Czech people of Slovak descent
Czech Protestants
Deaths by defenestration
Foreign ministers of Czechoslovakia
Government ministers of the Czechoslovak government-in-exile
Orders, decorations, and medals of the Czech Republic
People executed by defenestration
People from the Kingdom of Bohemia
Politicians from Prague
Recipients of the Order of Tomáš Garrigue Masaryk
Unsolved deaths
World War II political leaders
World Federation of United Nations Associations
Diplomats from Prague